George Thatcher (April 12, 1754 – April 6, 1824) was an American lawyer, jurist, and statesman from the Maine district of Massachusetts. His name sometimes appears as George Thacher. He was a delegate for Massachusetts to the Continental Congress in 1787 and 1788. He was an associate justice of the Massachusetts Supreme Judicial Court from 1801 to 1824.

Life
Thatcher was born April 12, 1754, in Yarmouth in the Province of Massachusetts Bay. After private tutoring, he attended Harvard, graduating in 1776. He read law and was admitted to the bar in 1778, and then moved to York in Massachusetts' District of Maine to open a practice. By 1782 he had settled in Biddeford.

Thatcher was named as one of the Massachusetts delegates to the Continental Congress in 1787. He wrote under the name "Scribble Scrabble."

Congressman
He was later elected a U.S. Congressman from the Maine district of Massachusetts, as a Pro-administration candidate in 1789 to 1792 and as a Federalist from 1794 to 1801.

Fugitive Slave Act
In 1788 North Carolina passed a law allowing the capture and sale of any former slave who had been freed without court approval. Many freed African Americans fled the state to avoid being captured and sold back into slavery. Rev Absalom Jones drafted a petition on behalf of four freed slaves, the first group of African Americans to petition the U.S. Congress. The petition related to the 1793 Fugitive Slave Act and asked Congress to adopt “some remedy for an evil of such magnitude.”

The petition was presented on January 30, 1797, by U.S. Representative John Swanwick of Pennsylvania. Although Representative Thatcher argued that the petition should be accepted and referred to the Committee on the Fugitive Law, the House of Representatives declined to accept the petition by a vote of was 50 to 33.

He did not seek re-election in 1800.  At the time he left the Congress, he was the last original Congressman still in office.

Later career
Thatcher accepted an appointment to a Massachusetts state court in 1792 and served until 1800 when he was appointed to the state's Supreme Judicial Court. During the organization of Maine's statehood in 1819, he was a member of the convention that created the new state's constitution. When statehood was achieved in 1820, he moved to Newburyport, Massachusetts.  He resigned from the court in January 1824, and retired to Biddeford, Maine.

Thatcher, an ardent Unitarian, helped to sponsor the creation of Bowdoin College so that Maine would have its own institution of higher education. For the college's first dozen years, he served as a regent.

Thatcher was elected a member of the American Antiquarian Society in 1814, and served on its board of councilors from 1815 to 1819.

Thatcher died at his home, and is buried in the Woodlawn Cemetery at Biddeford.

References

External links 

1754 births
1824 deaths
People from Yarmouth, Massachusetts
American Unitarians
Continental Congressmen from Massachusetts
18th-century American politicians
Members of the United States House of Representatives from the District of Maine
Harvard College alumni
Justices of the Massachusetts Supreme Judicial Court
People from York, Maine
Politicians from Biddeford, Maine
Federalist Party members of the United States House of Representatives from Massachusetts
Members of the American Antiquarian Society
U.S. state supreme court judges admitted to the practice of law by reading law
Deans of the United States House of Representatives
Pro-Administration Party members of the United States House of Representatives